Oscar Torre is an American actor, film director and producer.

Personal life 
He was born in Miami, Florida, to Cuban-born parents, who immigrated to the United States as teenagers. Torre's wife is Chuti Tiu.

Career 
Torre is known for the role of Santo in the CBS TV series Cane (TV series), as one of the leads (Miguelito) in the LIONSGATE film To Rob a Thief (Spanish: Ladrón que Roba a Ladrón) and The Hangover Part III. 
In 2014, in addition to acting and producing, Torre debuted as director of the award winning Pretty Rosebud, which starred his wife Chuti Tiu.

In 2018, He played mob boss Vinny Malone on Tyler Perry's The Haves and the Have Nots

Torre recent starred in the Julie Roberts - Sean Penn lead Emmy Nominated series Gastlit

Filmography

References

External links
 
 Hollywood and Latinos, Past and Present: Cubano Actor Oscar Torre Talks the Hollywood Hustle 
 Oscar Torre & Chuti Tiu — Award Winning Filmmakers
 Oscar Torre Cuban Actor / Cane (TV series) CBS

Living people
20th-century American male actors
21st-century American male actors
American male film actors
American male television actors
American people of Cuban descent
Hispanic and Latino American male actors
Male actors from Miami
Place of birth missing (living people)
Year of birth missing (living people)